State Highway 207 (SH 207) is a state highway in the U.S. state of Colorado connecting Manzanola and Crowley. SH 207's southern terminus is at U.S. Route 50 (US 50) in Manzanola, and the eastern terminus is at SH 96 in Crowley.

Route description
SH 207 runs , starting at a junction with  US 50 in Manzanola, heading north across the Arkansas River and ending at a junction with  SH 96 in Crowley.

Major intersections

References

External links

207
Transportation in Otero County, Colorado
Transportation in Crowley County, Colorado